The Ven. Guy Mayfield (23 June 1905–19 July 1976) was Archdeacon of Hastings from 1956 to 1975.

He was educated at Lancing College and Magdalene College, Cambridge.
Ordained 1930, Curate St John's Fitzroy Square, St. Saviour's, Walton Street, SW; Hurstpierpoint, Asst Editor The Guardian, 1936–39; Chaplain, RAFVR, 1939, Duxford, Gibraltar, Egypt and The Sudan, 1943. Rector: St Paul's, St Leonards-on-Sea, 1946; Little Horsted, 1948; Dir of Religious Education, Chichester Diocese, 1948; Dep. Diocesan Sec., Press Sec., 1950; Prebendary in Chichester Cathedral, 1956, Select Preacher, Cambridge Univ.

Mayfield was stationed at RAF Duxford during the Battle of Britain. His previously unpublished war diary for the time was published by the Imperial War Museum in April 2018.

He was Chairman of the College Council of Ardingly College from 1964 to 1972.

Published works

References

External links

1905 births
1976 deaths
People educated at Lancing College
Alumni of Magdalene College, Cambridge
Archdeacons of Hastings